Lazhar Hadj Aïssa (born 23 March 1984 in Batna) is an Algerian professional football player who currently plays as an attacking midfielder for NRB Teleghma in the Algerian Ligue 2.

Personal
Hadj Aïssa is nicknamed "Baggio" because of his hair and his style of play's similarity to Italian legend Roberto Baggio.

Club career

MSP Batna
Hadj Aïssa started his playing career in 1994 with his hometown club MSP Batna, starting with the youth sides and progressing to become one of the most talented players at the club. In the 2003–2004 season, he made his full debut for the club in the Algerian Second Division, with his performances on the pitch attracting loads of interest from various domestic clubs.

ES Sétif
In the summer of 2004, Hadj Aïssa joined ES Sétif and made 25 appearances, scoring 2 goals, in his first season. The following season, he made 28 appearances and scored 5 goals.

On 10 June 2006, on the recommendation of Zinedine Zidane, Hadj Aïssa was offered a trial with Spanish club Real Madrid.

In his third season with the club, Hadj Aïssa helped ES Sétif win the 2006–2007 Algerian League, their first league title since 1987. He also played a crucial role in the team's triumph in the 2006–2007 edition of the Arab Champions League and was named the Best Player of the competition.

The following season, he helped the club win the 2007–08 Arab Champions League. However, on the domestic front, the club could only manage a third-place finish.

On 11 July 2008, it was announced that he was going on trial with Portuguese club Benfica. However, days later, he announced that he would not join the club because they were looking to loan him out. Two weeks later, he traveled to Ukraine and signed with Metalist Kharkov but the club would not match the price tag set by ES Sétif president Abdelhakim Serrar.

On 9 August 2009, Hadj Aïssa signed with Saudi Arabian club Al-Ettifaq. However, a few days later, the contract was canceled after Al-Ettifaq faced financial difficulties and failed to pay the transfer fee to ES Sétif.

On 24 August 2009, it was announced that he was going on trial with English Premier League club Portsmouth. He trained with the club until the end of the transfer window, on 31 September but did not end up signing because of work permit issues. Portsmouth had been keen on keeping him, but due to the administrative issues they were unable to do so.

In 2010, he captained his side in the final of the Algerian Cup, in which they won 3–0.

Qadsia SC
On 15 August 2011, Hadj Aïssa signed a one-year contract with Kuwaiti Premier League club Qadsia SC.

Statistics

Honours

Club
ES Sétif
 Algerian Championnat National: 2006–07, 2008–09, Runner-up 2009–10
 North African Cup of Champions: 2009
 Algerian Cup: 2009–10
 North African Super Cup: 2010
 North African Cup Winners Cup:  2010
 Arab Champions League: 2006–07, 2007–08
 CAF Confederation Cup: Runner-up 2008–09

Qadsia SC
Kuwait Emir Cup: 2011–12
Kuwaiti Premier League: 2011–12

Awards
 Best player of the Arab Champions League in 2007
 Best young player of the Algerian League in 2005

References

External links
 
 Lazhar Hadj Aïssa at dzfoot.com
 

1984 births
Living people
Algerian footballers
Algeria international footballers
Chaoui people
ES Sétif players
Algerian Ligue Professionnelle 1 players
Algeria A' international footballers
MSP Batna players
Qadsia SC players
Algeria under-23 international footballers
2011 African Nations Championship players
Expatriate footballers in Kuwait
Expatriate footballers in the United Arab Emirates
Algerian expatriate footballers
People from Batna, Algeria
Algeria youth international footballers
Algerian expatriate sportspeople in Kuwait
Algerian expatriate sportspeople in the United Arab Emirates
Sharjah FC players
MC Alger players
Al Safa FC players
UAE First Division League players
Saudi First Division League players
Association football midfielders
Kuwait Premier League players
21st-century Algerian people